Ceratozamia is a genus of New World cycads in the family Zamiaceae. The genus contains 27 known currently living species and one or two fossil species. Most species are endemic to mountainous areas of Mexico, while few species extend into the mountains of Guatemala, Honduras and Belize. The genus name comes from the Greek ceras, meaning horn, which refers to the paired, spreading horny projections on the male and female sporophylls of all species.

Many species have extremely limited ranges, and almost all described species are listed as vulnerable, endangered, or critically endangered by the IUCN Red List. The whole genus is listed under CITES Appendix I / EU Annex A, which prohibits international trade in specimens of these species except when the purpose of the import is not commercial, for instance for scientific research. Illegal plant poaching has posed a major threat to Ceratozamia species.

Description 
The plants are dioecious, with a globose or cylindrical stem, rarely dichotomously branched, that may be underground or emergent. Several species produce basal shoots or suckers. The leaves are pinnately compound, straight, and spirally arranged. Leaf bases are usually deciduous but sometimes persistent. The petioles and rachis often have spines, though there may be very few to none. Leaflets are simple, entire, and articulate at the base, with parallel side veins and no distinct central vein. Male cones are cylindrical, upright, hairy, and stalked. Female cones are stalked or sessile, erect, and have short hairs. Seeds are oblong or elliptical, with a fleshy whitish outer coat.

Distribution and habitat 
Most species inhabit mountainous areas at 800–1000 m elevation, on sheltered slopes in moist forests. These forests range from tropical rainforests that are always wet, to pine-oak forests with alternating wet and dry seasons. There is a noticeable correlation between characteristics of species and the wetness or dryness of the habitat. Species with broad, thin leaflets live in wet habitats, and species with narrow, thick leaflets live in climates with wet and dry seasons.

Classification 
The genus consists of 27 known species:

Fossil record
There are several described fossil species, among them †Ceratozamia hofmannii and †Ceratozamia wrightii. Ceratozamia wrightii is the first evidence of the genus in the fossil record, with leaf fragments of the species found in Eocene deposits on Kupreanof Island in Alaska. This would support the hypothesis that there was a subtropical climate in northern areas during the Tertiary.

A fossil leaflet fragment of †Ceratozamia floersheimensis from the Rupelian stage of the Lower Oligocene has been found in marine sediments of the Bodenheim Formation in Rauenberg, Baden-Württemberg, Germany. Apart from Rauenberg and Flörsheim in Germany it is also known from the Oligocene of Budapest, Hungary and Trbovlje, Slovenia. A modern relationship exists to C. microstrobila, C. moretti, C. latifoli and C. delucana.

A fossil leaf fragment of †Ceratozamia hofmannii has been recorded and described from Münzenberg near Leoben (upper Lower Miocene of Styria, Austria.
A fragmentary leaflet assigned to †C. hofmannii was recovered in the uppermost part of the Most Formation (Most Basin)) in North Bohemia, Czech Republic and dated by magnetostratigraphy and cyclostratigraphy to the last part of the early Miocene.

References

Bibliography

External links 

 Ceratozamia at The Cycad Pages
 Ceratozamia at the Gymnosperm Database

 
Zamiaceae
Taxa named by Adolphe-Théodore Brongniart